Haroa may refer to several places:

Haroa (community development block), a community development block in North 24 Parganas district, West Bengal, India
Haroa (Vidhan Sabha constituency), an assembly constituency in North 24 Parganas district, West Bengal, India
Haroa, North 24 Parganas, village in West Bengal, India
Haroa River, in India
Haroa, Fiji a village of Motusa in Fiji